Every Kind of Light is the sixth studio album by The Posies, released on June 28, 2005 by Rykodisc. This was the first full-length album release by the band since 1998's Success, after which they had disbanded. Starting in 2000, the band began performing numerous reunion shows, while principal songwriters Ken Stringfellow and Jon Auer pursued solo recordings and tours. This is the first Posies album to feature bassist/guitarist Matt Harris and drummer Darius Minwalla.

Distribution 
Every Kind of Light was available on iTunes three weeks prior to its announced release, and the album quickly hit the iTunes Most Popular list. Two songs from the album, "Love Comes" and "I Guess You're Right", came as sample music on Windows Vista-equipped computers.

Reception

Every Kind of Light received mixed to positive reviews. On the review aggregate site Metacritic, the album has a score of 66 out of 100, indicating "generally favorable reviews."

Peter Gaston of Spin wrote that "Even with a rather ho-hum second stanza, Every Kind of Light is an instant reminder that the '90s would have been a far worse place without the Posies, and that this decade is much better off with them around." Joe Tangari of Pitchfork called the album "...a decent record spiked with a few classic moments of patent posies pop ecstasy, even though the album fails to live up to The Posies previous works." In a mixed review, AllMusic's Mark Deming called the album "...a bit hollow," writing that "It's nice to have the Posies back in the studio again," but that "Every Kind of Light isn't the triumphant return fans might have hoped for."

Track listing

Personnel
The Posies
Jon Auer - lead vocals, guitars
Ken Stringfellow - lead vocals, guitars, bass
Matt Harris - bass, guitar
Darius Minwalla - drums
Additional personnel
Dan Marcus - trombone on "I Finally Found a Jungle I Like!!"
Jay Thomas - trumpet on "Last Crawl" and "I Finally Found a Jungle I Like!!"
Production
Ineptunes - production
Kip Beelman - engineer
Ed Brooks - mastering
Rick Fisher - mastering
Paul Grosso - art direction, design

References 

2005 albums
The Posies albums
Rykodisc albums
Microsoft Windows sample music